Yuneswaran Ramaraj commonly referred to as R. Yuneswaran is a Malaysian politician who has served as the Member of Parliament (MP) for Segamat since November 2022.

Election result

References

Living people
21st-century Malaysian politicians
People from Johor
Malaysian people of Indian descent
Members of the 15th Malaysian Parliament
Malaysian politicians of Indian descent
People's Justice Party (Malaysia) politicians
Year of birth missing (living people)